Takaharu Nakai (born 10 March 1984) is a Japanese snowboarder. He competed at the 2002 Winter Olympics and the 2006 Winter Olympics.

References

1984 births
Living people
Japanese male snowboarders
Olympic snowboarders of Japan
Snowboarders at the 2002 Winter Olympics
Snowboarders at the 2006 Winter Olympics
Sportspeople from Hokkaido
Asian Games medalists in snowboarding
Snowboarders at the 2003 Asian Winter Games
Asian Games silver medalists for Japan
Medalists at the 2003 Asian Winter Games
21st-century Japanese people